KGFZ (97.7 FM) is a terrestrial American radio station, broadcasting a Spanish language Christian based Contemporary Hit Radio music format, in full simulcast with co-owned KLFZ Jacksonville. Licensed to Burke, the station serves the Lufkin-Nacogdoches area. The license is held by the Educational Radio Foundation of East Texas, headquartered in Tyler, Texas.

History
The station was assigned the call sign KBOG on February 19, 2008. On July 20, 2009, the station changed its call sign to KAGZ.
KAGZ (first as "Z93.9", then as "Z97.7") was broadcasting a Classic Hip Hop and R&B, owned by E-String Wireless, prior to the sale of the facility to the ERFET.

On July 22, 2022, the station changed its call sign to KGFZ, reflecting the change in format, after beginning a simulcast of "Fuzíon" programming based in Tyler.

References

External links
 

GFZ
Urban contemporary radio stations in the United States
Radio stations established in 2008
2008 establishments in Texas